Terje Hauge (born 5 October 1965 in Bergen, Norway) is a former Norwegian football referee from the club Olsvik IL.

Career
Since he made his debut in 1990, Hauge has refereed 232 matches in the Tippeligaen. He has been an authorised FIFA referee since 1993. He won the Kniksen award as referee of the year in the Tippeligaen in 2004, 2007 and 2010.
Hauge is currently ranked as an Elite referee in the UEFA Referees Categories.

Matches refereed in the Tippeligaen: 301
Matches refereed in the European cups: 50+
Matches refereed for National teams: 50+

Hauge has also refereed in the 2002 World Cup, Euro 2000 (4th referee), Euro 2004 and the 1996 and 2003 Norwegian cup finals. He also refereed the UEFA Super Cup match between FC Porto and Valencia CF at the Stade Louis II in Monaco on 27 August 2004.

Hauge was not selected to referee at the Euro 2008 tournament however, his fellow countryman and colleague Tom Henning Øvrebø given the honor instead. This marked the first time Øvrebø was selected over Hauge to referee at a major tournament.

He also refereed the 2005 Ukrainian Cup Final.

In a UEFA Champions League tie between Chelsea and Barcelona, Hauge sent off Chelsea defender Asier del Horno for a challenge on Barcelona's Lionel Messi, and Chelsea eventually slipped to a 2–1 defeat. After the match Hauge received death threats from Chelsea fans, but stood by his decision.

On 17 May 2006, Terje Hauge became the first Norwegian referee to referee in a UEFA Champions League Final. He took charge of the match between Arsenal and Barcelona at the Stade de France in Paris. During the match, he created history when he showed a red card to goalkeeper Jens Lehmann of Arsenal, making Lehmann the first player ever to be sent off in a Champions League Final.

References

Kniksen Award winners
Norwegian football referees
FIFA World Cup referees
1965 births
Living people
2002 FIFA World Cup referees
UEFA Champions League referees
Sportspeople from Bergen
UEFA Euro 2004 referees